For the French politician of the revolutionary era, see Charles-Philippe Ronsin.

Ronsin (or: Ronsen) is a village in the Kogho Department of Ganzourgou Province in central Burkina Faso. The village had a population of 365(as of 2008).

References

External links
Satellite map at Maplandia.com

Populated places in the Plateau-Central Region
Ganzourgou Province